Tae-soo is a Korean male given name. Its meaning differs based on the hanja used to write each syllable of the name. There are 20 hanja with the reading "tae" and 34 hanja with the reading "soo" on the South Korean government's official list of hanja which may be registered for use in given names.

People with this name include:
Kim Tae-su (born 1981), South Korean football midfielder
Jun Tae-soo (born 1984), South Korean actor
Park Tae-soo (born 1989), South Korean football defender

Fictional characters with this name include:
Tae-soo Park, character in manga Sun-Ken Rock

See also
List of Korean given names

References

Korean masculine given names